is a train station on the JR West Onoda Line in Ube, Yamaguchi Prefecture, Japan.

Station layout
The unattended station consists of one island platform serving two tracks. The station building is located north of the platforms and is connected via a level crossing.

History
The station opened on 16 May 1929.

References

External links

  

Railway stations in Yamaguchi Prefecture